Arkadiusz Czesław Rybicki (12 January 1953 – 10 April 2010) was a Polish politician.

Biography
Rybicki was born in Gdynia. In the 1980s he was active in the Solidarity movement. He was elected to the Sejm on 25 September 2005, getting 9466 votes in 25 Gdańsk district as a candidate from the Civic Platform list.

He was listed on the flight manifest of the Tupolev Tu-154 of the 36th Special Aviation Regiment carrying the President of Poland Lech Kaczyński which crashed near Smolensk-North airport near Pechersk near Smolensk, Russia, on 10 April 2010, killing all aboard.

Honours and awards
In 1999 Rybicki received the Order for Merit to Culture. In 2001 was awarded the French Ordre national du Mérite, granted by President Jacques Chirac. In 2005 he received the Medal of the 25th Anniversary of Solidarity.

On 16 April 2010, Rybicki was posthumously awarded the Grand Cross of the Order of Polonia Restituta.

See also

 Members of Polish Sejm 2005–2007

References

External links
 Arkadiusz Rybicki - parliamentary page - includes declarations of interest, voting record, and transcripts of speeches. 

Members of the Polish Sejm 2005–2007
Civic Platform politicians
1953 births
2010 deaths
Victims of the Smolensk air disaster
People from Gdynia
Grand Crosses of the Order of Polonia Restituta
Recipients of the Gold Medal for Merit to Culture – Gloria Artis
Recipients of the Ordre national du Mérite
University of Gdańsk alumni
Members of the Polish Sejm 2007–2011
Recipient of the Meritorious Activist of Culture badge